Stitch up may refer to:

 Stitch Up!, a British children's TV show
 Stitch up, or frameup, to falsely implicate someone
 Stitch up, to close by sewing

See also
Stitch (disambiguation)